HMS Caesar, also Cæsar, was an 80-gun third rate ship of the line of the Royal Navy, launched on 16 November 1793 at Plymouth. She was designed by Sir Edward Hunt, and was the only ship built to her draught. She was also one of only two British-built 80-gun ships of the period, the other being HMS Foudroyant.

Service
In 1798, some of her crew were court-martialed for mutiny.

Battle of Algeciras Bay

She was involved in the Battle of Algeciras Bay in 1801, during which her Master, William Grave, was killed

Battle of Cape Ortegal

The Battle of Cape Ortegal was the final action of the Trafalgar Campaign, and was fought between a squadron of the Royal Navy and a remnant of the fleet that had been destroyed several weeks earlier at the Battle of Trafalgar. It took place on 4 November 1805 off Cape Ortegal, in north-west Spain and saw a squadron under Captain Sir Richard Strachan in Caesar defeat and capture a French squadron under Rear-Admiral Pierre Dumanoir le Pelley.

Battle of Les Sables-d'Olonne
In 1809, she took part in the Battle of Les Sables-d'Olonne.

Fate
She was converted to serve as a depot ship in 1814, and was broken up in 1821.

Notes

References

Lavery, Brian (2003) The Ship of the Line - Volume 1: The development of the battlefleet 1650-1850. Conway Maritime Press. .
McCarthy, Pete (2003) The Road to McCarthy Sceptre. .

External links
 

Ships of the line of the Royal Navy
1793 ships